Trancoso may refer to:

Trancoso Municipality, Zacatecas, a municipality in the state of Zacatecas, Mexico
Trancoso, Portugal, a municipality in the district of Guarda in the region of Centro, Portugal
Castle of Trancoso
Trancoso, Bahia, a district in the municipality of Porto Seguro in the state of Bahia, Brazil